Hondomairo is an administrative ward in the Kondoa district of the Dodoma Region of Tanzania. According to the 2012 census, the ward has a total population of 8114  people.

References
 

Dodoma Region
Kondoa District